The 2015 FC Tokyo season was the club's 15th season and the fourth consecutive in the top division of Japanese football. It was Massimo Ficcadenti's second season as manager.

Squad

Out on loan

Transfers

Winter

In:

Out:

Summer

In:

Out:

Competitions

J. League

First stage

Results summary

Results by round

Results

League table

Second stage

Results summary

Results by round

Results

League table

Overall

J. League Cup

Group stage

Knockout stage

Emperor's Cup

Squad statistics

Appearances and goals

|-
|colspan="14"|Players who left FC Tokyo during the season:

|}

Goal Scorers

Disciplinary record

References

FC Tokyo
FC Tokyo seasons